Adrianne is a given name. It is the feminine form of the male name Adrian. People named Adrianne include:

 Adrianne Allen (1907–1993), English stage actress
 Adrianne Baughns-Wallace (born 1944), American television journalist
 Adrianne Byrd (1970–2020), American author
 Adrianne Calvo (born 1984), American chef
 Adrianne Curry (born 1982), American model
 Adrianne Dunnett (born 1961), Canadian rhythmic gymnast
 Adrianne Frost (born 1978), American comedian, actress, and author
 Adrianne Gonzalez (born 1977), American songwriter, producer, composer, and mix engineer, known professionally as AG
 Adrianne Harun, American writer
 Adrianne Ho, Canadian model, designer, and director
 Adrianne Lenker (born 1991), American folk singer/songwriter
 Adrianne León (born 1987), American singer and actress
 Adrianne Lobel, American stage designer and producer
 Adrianne Palicki (born 1983), American actress and model
 Adrianne Pieczonka (born 1963), Canadian opera singer
 Adrianne Todman, American politician
 Adrianne Tolsch (1938–2016), American comedian
 Adrianne Wadewitz (1977–2014), American feminist scholar and Wikipedian
 Adrianne Wortzel (born 1941), American artist

See also

 Adrienne

Feminine given names